Nathan Wynn was a rugby league footballer for FC.Lézignan from 2010 to 2013, during which time they won the Lord Derby Cup (2010 and 2011) and the Elite 1 (2010/2011). He was named "Scrum Half of the Year" in the 2010/2011 season. He formerly played for Toulouse Olympique, Canterbury Bulldogs, Sydney Bulls and St George Illawarra Dragons, who won the 2005 Jersey Flegg Grand Final. His team position was Scrum Half. He proved to be one of the key signees by the Toulouse Olympique for its entry in the Championship in the 2009/2010 season, finishing the season as their leading point scorer. Nathan Wynn had a high rate of success at goal kicks and was one of the key playmakers of the team.

References

External links
Toulouse Olympique profile
The Daily Telegraph: "Sons of guns forced to pack their bags"

1986 births
Living people
Australian rugby league players
Lézignan Sangliers players
Toulouse Olympique players
Sydney Bulls players
Rugby league halfbacks